Graford Independent School District is a public school district based in Graford, Texas (USA) and is located in north central Palo Pinto County, a small part of the district extends into southern Jack County.

The district operates 2 campuses -

Graford High School (grades 7-12)
Graford Elementary School (grades K-6)

In 2009, the school district was rated "recognized" by the Texas Education Agency.

History
The district changed to a four day school week in fall 2022.

Students

Academics

Students in Graford earn scores near local region and statewide averages on standardized tests.  In 2018-2019 State of Texas Assessments of Academic Readiness (STAAR) results, 75% of students in Graford ISD met Approaches Grade Level standards, compared with 79% in Region 11 and 78% in the state of Texas. The average SAT score of students in 2017-18 was 1030, and the average ACT score is not available due to the small number of students taking the test.

Demographics
In the 2018–2019 school year, the school district had a total of 347 students, ranging from pre-kindergarten through grade 12. The class of 2018 included 18 graduates; the annual drop-out rate across grades 9-12 was reported as 1.0%.

As of the 2018–2019 school year, the ethnic distribution of the school district was 84.4% White, 13.0% Hispanic, 0.3% Asian, and 2.3% from two or more races. (No African American, American Indian, or Pacific Islander students were reported.) Economically disadvantaged students made up 58.8% of the student body.

References

External links
Graford ISD

School districts in Palo Pinto County, Texas
School districts in Jack County, Texas